Darius Johnson may refer to:

 Darius Johnson (American football) (born 1991), American wide receiver
 Darius Johnson (footballer) (born 2000), English forward
 Darrius Johnson (1972–2021), American cornerback

See also
Darius Johnson-Odom (born 1989), American basketball player